Karen Ross is the Secretary of the California Department of Food and Agriculture, having been appointed to that post by Governor Jerry Brown on January 12, 2011.  She had previously served as Chief of Staff to U.S. Secretary of Agriculture Tom Vilsack, a position she accepted in 2009.  From 1996 to 2009, she was president of the California Association of Winegrape Growers (CAWG).   She is a graduate of the University of Nebraska, Lincoln, and the Nebraska Agricultural Leadership Program.

Her prior experience includes ten years as an advocate for agricultural and rural electric cooperatives at the state and national level, both in California and her native state of Nebraska, and serving as a staff member for then-United States Senator Edward Zorinsky of Nebraska from 1978 to 1985, and working on several U.S. Senate and presidential campaigns.

A major leader in California's agricultural community, she was born and reared on a family farm in western Nebraska which she and her husband co-own with her brother where her family still raises grain crops and cattle.

References

External links
Karen Ross-Secretary of CDFA-California Department of Food and Agriculture

American women farmers
California Democrats
Farmers from Nebraska
Living people
State cabinet secretaries of California
United States Department of Agriculture officials
University of Nebraska–Lincoln alumni
Women in California politics
Year of birth missing (living people)
21st-century American women